Chae Ji-hoon (Hangul: 채지훈; Hanja: 蔡智薰; born 5 March 1974) is a retired South Korean short track speed skater

Skating career
Chae won a gold medal in the 500 m and a silver medal in 1000 m at the 1994 Winter Olympics in Lillehammer. He is the 1995 Overall World Champion. He then won a silver medal in 5000 m relay at the 1998 Winter Olympics in Nagano.

Post career

External links
Database Olympics

Chae Ji-hoon Fancafe at Daum 

1974 births
Living people
South Korean male short track speed skaters
Olympic short track speed skaters of South Korea
Olympic gold medalists for South Korea
Olympic silver medalists for South Korea
Olympic medalists in short track speed skating
Short track speed skaters at the 1994 Winter Olympics
Short track speed skaters at the 1998 Winter Olympics
Medalists at the 1994 Winter Olympics
Medalists at the 1998 Winter Olympics
Asian Games medalists in short track speed skating
Asian Games gold medalists for South Korea
Asian Games silver medalists for South Korea
Short track speed skaters at the 1996 Asian Winter Games
Medalists at the 1996 Asian Winter Games
Yonsei University alumni
Universiade gold medalists for South Korea
Universiade medalists in short track speed skating
Competitors at the 1995 Winter Universiade
Competitors at the 1997 Winter Universiade
20th-century South Korean people